Lendl may refer to:

German name of Lengyel, Hungary
Lendl (surname)
Lendl Simmons, a West Indian cricketer

See also 
 Landl